Jim Freund is a radio personality and a prominent figure in the speculative fiction community as host of the Pacifica Radio show Hour of the Wolf and as  curator of the New York Review of Science Fiction Reading Series.

Biography
Freund lives in Brooklyn, New York with his partner, tech editor and author Barbara Krasnoff and "lots of toy penguins."

Career
As host and producer of Hour of the Wolf (created by Margot Adler), which has aired on WBAI in New York City since 1974, Freund has presented the work of and interviewed many major figures in speculative fiction. As curator of the New York Review of Science Fiction Reading Series he has been responsible for the presentation of a long-running series of live readings by major figures of speculative fiction.

He also has a deep interest in the stage and has produced three plays off-off-Broadway.

References

External links
 Hour of the Wolf, Official Site
 New York Review of Science Fiction, Official Site
https://brooklyneagle.com/articles/2019/06/10/hour-of-the-wolf-sci-fi-radio/
https://www.blackgate.com/2019/05/29/power-couples-in-the-world-of-speculative-fiction-jim-freund-and-barbara-krasnoff/

Radio personalities from New York City
American radio producers
Living people
Pacifica Foundation people
Year of birth missing (living people)